This is a list of  defunct educational establishments within the city boundary of London. It does not include institutions endowed by city businesses, livery companies or churches that had their boundary outside the square mile. Where no data could be found the box is left blank.

References 

Former buildings and structures in the City of London
Defunct schools in the City of London
City of London
Schools, London|Schools in the City of London
Schools
Lond